Tobias Charles "Sandy" Griffin (October 24, 1858 – June 24, 1926) was a Major League Baseball center fielder.

Griffin played for the New York Gothams (1884), Rochester Broncos (1890), Washington Statesmen (1891), and the National League St. Louis Browns (1893).

His most notable season was 1890 when he batted .307 in 107 games and finished in his league's top ten for doubles, home runs, and extra base hits. In 166 total games played he batted .275 with 5 home runs, 78 RBI, and 116 runs scored.

Griffin died at the age of 67 in Syracuse, New York of undisclosed causes.

See also
List of Major League Baseball player–managers

External links

Retrosheet

1858 births
1926 deaths
19th-century baseball players
People from Fayetteville, New York
Baseball players from Syracuse, New York
Major League Baseball center fielders
New York Giants (NL) players
Rochester Broncos players
Washington Statesmen players
Washington Statesmen managers
St. Louis Browns (NL) players
Utica Pent Ups players
Buffalo Bisons (minor league) players
Rochester Jingoes players
Omaha Lambs players
New Haven Nutmegs players
Syracuse Stars (minor league baseball) players
Wilkes-Barre Coal Barons players
Scranton Red Sox players
Scranton Miners players
Rochester Patriots players
Ottawa Wanderers players
Major League Baseball player-managers